TBZ, tbz, or TbZ can refer to:

A computer file, the result of tar and bzip2 operations.
Tetrabenazine, a drug
Thiabendazole, a parasiticide
Tabriz International Airport
Tahnoun bin Zayed Al Nahyan (national security advisor), National Security Advisor of UAE
The ICAO Airline Designator of Iranian ATA Airlines